Control point may refer to:

Control point (mathematics)
Control point (orienteering)
Control point (rail)
Control points (video games)
Counting point (logistics)
Geodetic control point
Port of entry
Border checkpoint
 Kilometre zero or mile zero, a point from which road distances are measured

See also

 
 
 
 
 
 
Control (disambiguation)
 Control station (disambiguation)
Point (disambiguation)